Hinduism is a minority religion in Germany. It is practised by 0.1% of the population of Germany. There are approximately 100,000 Hindus living in the country.

Demographics
From the 1950s, Indian Hindus were migrating to Germany. Since the 1970s, Tamils from Sri Lanka arrived as asylum seekers to Germany (Most of them were Hindus). In 2000, there were 90,000 Hindus in Germany.
In 2007, there were 6,000 Hindus in Berlin. In 2009, around 5,000 Hindus lived in Lower Saxony.

According to the statistics of REMID, in 2017 there were an estimated 130,000-150,000 Hindus in Germany. About 42,000–45,000 are Sri Lankan Tamils; 60,000–80,000 are Indian; more than 7,500 are Whites and others; and some 7,000–10,000 are Afghan Hindus.

Temples

Denominations

ISKCON
The first Hare Krishna temple in Germany was built 1970 in Hamburg. The ISKCON guru Sacinandana Swami translated the Bhagavad Gita into German.

Balinese Hinduism

There are about 700 Balinese Hindu families living in Germany, with the one temple located in Hamburg in front of the Museum of Ethnology, Hamburg and the second, Pura Tri Hita Karana located in Erholungspark Marzahn, Berlin.
Pura Tri Hita Karana is a functioning Hindu temple located in the Balinese Garden of the park. It is one of the few Hindu temples of Balinese architecture built outside Indonesia.

Famous German Hindus

Claudia Ciesla, Bollywood actress.
Walther Eidlitz, writer, poet, Indologist.
Hansadutta Swami
Mother Meera
Siva Sri Paskarakurukkal
Mathias Rust
Sadananda
Sacinandana Swami

See also
 Indians in Germany
 Religion in Germany

References

External links